HMS R3 was one of 10 R-class submarine built for the Royal Navy during the First World War. The boat was not completed before the end of the war and was sold for scrap in 1923.

Design and description
The R-class submarine was designed to meet an Admiralty requirement for a specialised hunter-killer submarine with an emphasis on submerged performance. They displaced  on the surface and  submerged. The R-class submarines had a crew of 2 officers and 20 ratings.

For surface running, the boats were powered by a single eight-cylinder   diesel engine that drove the single propeller shaft. When submerged it was driven by a  electric motor. They could reach  on the surface and  underwater.

The boats were armed with six 18-inch (45 cm) torpedo tubes in the bow. They carried six reload torpedoes for a grand total of a dozen torpedoes. They were equipped with an array of five hydrophones in the bow to allow them to locate and engage targets while submerged.

Construction and career
HMS R3 was laid down on 4 February 1917 at Chatham Dockyard, launched on 8 June 1918 and commissioned on 17 March 1919. She came too late to see any combat in World War I, like most of the other R class submarines. R3 was paid off in September 1919, then was sold on 21 February 1923.

Notes

References
 
 
 
 

 

British R-class submarines
Royal Navy ship names
1918 ships